This is a list of Time Team episodes from series 18. The series was released on DVD (region 2) in 2012 as "Tottiford and Other Digs".

Episode

Series 18

Episode # refers to the air date order. The Time Team Specials are aired in between regular episodes, but are omitted from this list. Regular contributors on Time Team include: Tony Robinson (presenter); archaeologists Mick Aston, Phil Harding, Helen Geake, Neil Holbrook, Raksha Dave; Victor Ambrus (illustrator); Stewart Ainsworth (landscape investigator); John Gater (geophysicist); Henry Chapman (surveyor); Paul Blinkhorn (pottery expert).

References

External links
Channel 4 Time Team episode features for series 18 including dig-reports and summaries by the archaeologists.
Time Team at Channel4.com
The Unofficial Time Team site Fan site

Time Team (Series 18)
2011 British television seasons